The Texas State Library and Archives Commission (TSLAC) refers to the agency in the state of Texas that assists the people of Texas to effectively use information, archival resources, public records and library materials to improve their lives, the lives of their families, and their communities. The agency is charged with overseeing statewide library programs, meeting the reading-related needs of Texans with disabilities, and preserving and providing access to significant Texas documents.

The Lorenzo de Zavala State Archives & Library Building, located at 1201 Brazos Street in the Capitol Complex in Downtown Austin, houses the Archives, the Genealogy collection, a reference collection, the Talking Books offices, and the main administrative offices.

The State Records Center and Talking Book Circulation Department, located elsewhere in Austin, which houses the State and Local Records Management Division and the Talking Book Program's circulation department; and the Sam Houston Regional Library and Research Center, located near Liberty, Texas, which serves as a museum focusing on Southeast Texas and also houses a portion of the State Library's collection.

The current Texas State Librarian is Gloria Meraz, appointed by the Texas State Library and Archives Commission on August 27, 2021. Meraz will be the first person of color and first Hispanic woman to serve as State Librarian of Texas since the position was created in 1909. She succeeded previous Texas State Librarian Mark Smith.

History
The Texas State Library was originally established as the National Library of the Republic of Texas on 24 January 1839 by a joint resolution of the Third Congress of the Republic of Texas. $10,000 was designated for its use, though the ongoing bankruptcy of the Republic meant that no more than $250, spent on a set of encyclopedias, was used during this initial phase of development.

After the annexation of Texas to the United States in 1848, legislation was passed requiring copies of all important state-related documents to be transported to the Library of Congress, other US state seats, or foreign powers, as deemed necessary. During this time, the Secretary of the State of Texas was to act as the state librarian. In 1854 an act was passed creating a separate library for the Supreme Court of Texas, and in 1855 $5000 was appropriated for the purchase of books for the State Library, though any major work done on the library was postponed until after the American Civil War.

The office of State Librarian was officially established after the Civil War, and Robert Josselyn was the first appointment. The expenses pertaining to running or more fully establishing the library were seen as detrimental to the project of Reconstruction, however, and the library was again placed at the hands of the state department until 1876, when The Department of Insurance, Statistics, and History was established.

The commissioner of this department was in charge of the State Library, and from 1877 to 1880 a large number of documents, including the Nacogdoches Archives, were transferred to the State Library. On 9 November 1881 a massive fire destroyed the Texas Capitol Building, where the library was housed, and ruined much of the collection.

In 1891 construction of the present Capitol building was completed, and Governor James S. Hogg created the office of historical clerk, adding a Spanish translator and an archivist to the staff two years later. In 1902 a Texas Library Association was organized, aided by the Texas Federation of Women's Clubs, and in 1909 legislation was obtained for the organization of the Texas State Library and Historical Commission (now the Texas State Library and Archives Commission).

Not until 1957, when Gov. Marion Price Daniel, Sr. went before the Fifty-fifth Legislature and recommended that a building specifically for the State Library be erected, was there adequate housing for the growing collection.

The present building, named for Lorenzo de Zavala, was dedicated on April 10, 1962. Built of granite from the same quarry that supplied materials for the Texas State Capitol, the outer walls are made of sunset red granite. The building is 257 feet long, 77 feet wide, and 60 feet tall. It has five main floors and seven stack floors (the stacks are not open to the public). The three main collections open to public use are the Reference collection and Archives, both housed on the first floor, and the Genealogy collection, housed on the second.

Recent history
In 2011, during the 82nd Texas Legislature, governor Rick Perry signed the state's biennial budget (for FY 2012 - 2013) that cut state funding for TSLAC by 64 percent and cut state funding for the agency’s library programs by 88 percent. Other state agencies experienced budget cuts as well, the result of a $27 billion shortfall in state finances. “Everybody is just shaking their heads because this is more drastic than any measures we’ve seen in the past, and I’ve been around Texas libraries for more than 40 years,” said Jerilynn Williams, president of the Texas Library Association.

The agency took several actions as a result of these cuts: eliminated certain FTE positions; merged the two library-focused divisions to create the new Library Development and Networking Division; eliminated the Loan Star Libraries Grant Program of direct assistance to Texas public libraries; and eliminated 10 regional library systems.

In 2013, during the 83rd Legislature, the state restored substantial state funding to TSLAC for the 2014-2015 biennial budget, including $7.5 million for digital content (additional funds for the statewide e-content program known as TexShare and for databases for K-12 schools), $600,000 for three FTE archivists, and $1 million for repairs to the Sam Houston Center  in Liberty. Because of these gains, TSLAC was able to avert the loss of over $6.5 million in federal funds used to support statewide library services in the form of competitive library grants, interlibrary loan, and continuing education and consulting.

Throughout 2014 the three public service areas in the Lorenzo de Zavala Building – the Texas State Archives, the Texas Family Heritage Research Center, and the Reference and Information Center—will be open the second Saturday of each month.

In 2019, the library was used as a filming location for the YouTube interactive series A Heist with Markiplier.

See also

Austin Public Library
Houston Public Library
Dallas Public Library
San Antonio Public Library
Harris County Public Library
Fort Worth Library
Alamo Area Library System

References

Further reading
 Gracy, David B., The State Library and Archives of Texas: A History, 1835-1962
 Cummings, Jennifer, “‘How Can We Fail?’ The Texas State Library’s Traveling Libraries and Bookmobiles, 1916–1966,” Libraries and the Cultural Record, 44 (no. 3, 2009), 299–325.

External links

Libraries in Austin, Texas
Library and Archives Commission, Texas State
State archives of the United States
State libraries of the United States
Research libraries in the United States